Alain Ange-Marie Filloux (born May 1, 1961) is a French/British microbiologist who is a Professor of Molecular Microbiology at Imperial College London. His research looks at the chronic infection of Pseudomonas aeruginosa, a Gram-negative bacterium that causes nosocomial infections in people who are immunocompromised and a deadly threat for cystic fibrosis patients.

Early life and education 
Filloux was a graduate student at Universite d'Aix-Marseille II, where he started to study protein secretion in Pseudomonas aeruginosa. He obtained his doctorate under the supervision of Andrée Lazdunski in 1988 and with the support of a European Union fellowship moved to the Netherlands for his postdoctoral research, where he joined Utrecht University and the laboratory of Dr Jan Tommassen.

Research and career 
In 1990, Filloux was promoted to Assistant Professor at Utrecht University, and continued to explore protein secretion in Gram-negative bacteria. He identified that a common mechanism is responsible for the transport of macromolecules across the outer membrane of Gram-negative bacteria that includes Pseudomonas aeruginosa. In particular he co-discovered what is now called the type II secretion system (T2SS). This finding contributed to understanding protein secretion systems in Gram-negative bacteria, which are essential to their pathogenicity.

In 1994, Filloux was appointed to the French National Centre for Scientific Research (CNRS) as a Research Associate (CR1). In 2001, he was promoted as Research Director and headed his laboratory on “Molecular Microbiology and Pathogenicity in Pseudomonads”. Filloux became the Director of the CNRS research unit Laboratoire d’Ingénierie des Systèmes Macromoléculaires in 2003. Filloux became increasingly interested in the ability that allows bacteria to live on a surface or tissues as a resilient community known as biofilm. Biofilms are intrinsically resistant to eradication by antibiotics or the immune system, and present a major issue in healthcare. He used bacterial genetics to identify a series of molecular determinants involved in the biofilm formation process, notably extracellular appendages, or fimbriae, he called Cup. Working with Stephen Lory from Harvard Medical School, Filloux discovered a regulatory switch, LadS, which allows Pseudomonas aeruginosa to transition from planktonic to a biofilm.

In 2007 he joined Imperial College London, where he was appointed Professor and Chair of the Centre for Molecular Bacteriology and Infection. Filloux continued to work on protein secretion systems, but concentrated his research on the so-called Type VI secretion system (T6SS), a molecular crossbow that delivers toxins in competing bacterial competitors and kills them. He discovered many T6SS toxins in Pseudomonas aeruginosa and described how these could be transported in target bacteria notably by being placed at the tip of the molecular arrowhead.

One such example is VgrG2b, which contains a metallopeptidase domain targeting, in the prey bacteria, proteins involved in cell wall integrity and cell division. Bacterial preys will then collapse, as they do for example when treated with Βeta-lactam antibiotics. Filloux also carried on studying biofilms, and gained interest in a central switch which involves the universal second messenger cyclic-di-GMP. It was known that high levels of c-di-GMP in bacterial cells turns on biofilm development, and Filloux showed that concomitantly high c-di-GMP levels turned on the T6SS. This suggested that the T6SS is put in place when cells enter a phase allowing polymicrobial communities to establish and is thus prepared to eliminate foes.

While continuing studying protein secretion and biofilm formation, Filloux gained interest investigating antibiotic resistance. He collaborated with Dr Gerald Larrouy-Maumus on the development of a protocol for rapid antibiotic resistance screening using mass spectrometry.

Membership and editorial boards 
Filloux has served as an editor for several scientific journals. Filloux was appointed Editor-in-Chief for FEMS Microbiology Reviews in 2013. He was appointed Editor-in-Chief for npj Biolfilms and Microbiomes, which is part of the Nature Partner Journals series, in 2018.

Filloux has held several scientific administrative positions including membership of the BBSRC - Research Grants Committee B (2009-2011).

Awards and honours 
 2004 Fondation Bettencourt Schueller Coup d’élan
 2006 Jacques Piraud award for research on infectious diseases
 2007 Royal Society Wolfson Research Merit Award
2016 Elected to the European Academy of Microbiology
2017 Elected a fellow of the American Academy of Microbiology
2019 Elected a fellow of the Royal Society of Biology

Selected academic works

Publications

Books

References 

Living people
Academic staff of Utrecht University
Academics of Imperial College London
Aix-Marseille University alumni
French microbiologists
1961 births